Birger Gregersson (Latin: Birgerus Gregorii) (c. 1327 – 11 March 1383) was Archbishop of Uppsala from 1366 until his death 1383.

Biography
Birger Gregersson was probably born the son of Greger Jonsson av Malstaätten of  Norrtälje-Malsta parish in  Uppland.

He was vicar of Österhaninge and then priest in Uppsala. He was canon of Strängnäs Cathedral from 1342  and dean of Uppsala Cathedral from 1356.  He was a supporter of King Albrekt (c. 1338–1412) who appointed him chancellor. In 1365, Birger Gregersson is mentioned in the Diplomatarium Fennicum. In 1366, Birger Gregersson was elected archbishop of Uppsala diocese. He is considered one of the most important Swedish writers in the Middle Ages. 

He wrote a biography of Saint Birgitta  (c. 1303–1373) and hymns to her and in honor of 12th-century missionary Saint Botvid  (died ca 1120).

See also 
 List of Archbishops of Uppsala

References

Other sources
 Birger Gregersson Nordisk familjebok

 

Roman Catholic archbishops of Uppsala
14th-century Roman Catholic archbishops in Sweden
Swedish male writers
1327 births
1383 deaths
People from Uppland